5th Battalion Bombay Sepoys may refer to:

109th Infantry which was called the 5th Battalion Bombay Sepoys in 1768
104th Wellesley's Rifles which was called the 5th Battalion Bombay Sepoys in 1775